Billy Sprague (born July 17, 1952) is an American Christian pop singer, songwriter, and producer.

Sprague was born in Tulsa, Oklahoma, to William Sprague and Oteka (Barnes) Sprague.  He was raised in Borger, Texas.  He attended Texas Christian University, graduating in 1979, then studied English in a Master's program at the University of Texas. Starting in 1981 he played in Amy Grant's backup band, and also embarked on a songwriting career. His compositions would be recorded by Brown Bannister, Gary Chapman, Sandi Patty, Bebe and Cece Winans, Kathy Troccoli, and Debby Boone.

He began recording under his own name in 1984, releasing an album, "_", produced by Michael W. Smith. A second album, Serious Fun, followed in 1986, featuring production by Wayne Kirkpatrick and a song co-written by Chris Rodriguez. Sprague ceased recording and performing in 1989 after his fiance was killed in a car crash while driving to one of his concerts, not returning until 1992. During this time he continued working as a producer, and produced the album Friends Forever Part 2, which won a Dove Award for Best Musical Album in 1990. Switching to Benson Records, Sprague released Torn Between Two Worlds in 1992 and The Wind and the Wave in 1993. In 1994, he married, and continued songwriting through the decade of the 1990s.

In 2015, Sprague released a new album, Songs In The Key Of Awe, after a successful fundraising campaign on Kickstarter.

Discography
What a Way to Go (Reunion Records, 1984)
Serious Fun (Reunion, 1986)
La Vie (Reunion, 1988)
I Wish (Reunion, 1989)
Torn Between Two Worlds (Benson Records, 1992)
The Wind and the Wave (Benson, 1993)
Soundtrack of My Soul (Mission Music, 2004)
Songs In The Key Of Awe (Independent, 2015)

References

1952 births
Living people
Musicians from Tulsa, Oklahoma
Record producers from Oklahoma
Songwriters from Oklahoma
Singers from Oklahoma
American male songwriters
American performers of Christian music
American male singers